Hell's Valley is a 1931 American pre-Code 
Western film directed by Alan James and starring Hal Taliaferro, Virginia Brown Faire and Walter Miller. It is a remake of When a Man Rides Alone (1919).

Synopsis
A Captain in the Texas Rangers goes in pursuit of the notorious bandit gang of the Valdez brothers.

Cast
 Hal Taliaferro as Wally, Texas Rangers Captain 
 Virginia Brown Faire as Rosita Flores 
 Walter Miller as Carlos Valdez 
 Franklyn Farnum as Manuel Valdez 
 Vivian Rich as Housekeeper 
 Lafe McKee as Don Flores 
 Jack Phipps as Jose Valdez 
 Frank Lackteen as Henchman 
 Bobby Dunn as Shorty, Texas Ranger

References

Bibliography
 Michael R. Pitts. Poverty Row Studios, 1929–1940: An Illustrated History of 55 Independent Film Companies, with a Filmography for Each. McFarland & Company, 2005.

External links
 

1931 films
1931 Western (genre) films
American Western (genre) films
Films directed by Alan James
1930s English-language films
1930s American films